Michael Cameron Brial (born 11 May 1970, in Narrabri, New South Wales) is an Australian former rugby union player. He played as back-row, usually as number 8.

Career

Club career
Brial grew up playing rugby league in his high school days. He first played rugby union at the age of 14, joining the Narrabri Blue Boars, where his brother Brenden played. Two years later, he joined the Narrabri High School team, with which he won the under-19 Wiburd Shield. He also represented Central North in the U-14, U-16 and U-19 teams. In 1992, Brial made his debut for New South Wales during the match against Wellington at the Athletic Park, earning also a spot in the Australia XV squad for the 1992 end-of-year tour in Ireland and Wales. He also played for the New South Wales Waratahs  during the Super 12, where he captained the team between 1998 and 1999, until his retirement in 2000.

International career
Brial earned his first international cap for Australia against France in Bordeaux, on 30 October 1993, as a substitute for Ilie Tabua as blindside flanker. In the second test in Paris, he debuted in the starting XV as a loosehead flanker. He was not called up for the 1995 Rugby World Cup squad. In 1996 he played mostly as number 8 and earned ten caps.  In July 1996, during the second Bledisloe Cup test against New Zealand in Brisbane, Brial furiously punched Frank Bunce, with whom he had a feud four years before in a provincial game. However, Brial was not sent out by the referee.
His last cap was during the Bledisloe Cup test against New Zealand, on 23 October 1997, in Melbourne. In his entire international career he earned 13 caps in aggregate and scored 1 try and 5 points in aggregate. He also was part of the Australia national rugby sevens team which took part at the 1997 Rugby World Cup Sevens in Hong Kong.

References

External links
 Michael Brial profile at Rugby Australia
 Michael Brial  at New Zealand Rugby History 
 

1970 births
Living people
Australian rugby union players
Australia international rugby union players
Rugby union flankers
Rugby union number eights
New South Wales Waratahs players
Australia international rugby sevens players
Rugby union players from New South Wales